Prezzo Holdings Limited is a chain restaurant operator in the United Kingdom.

History
In 2014 the company was bought by private equity investment firm TPG Capital for just over £300 million.

On 23 March 2018 Prezzo Holdings announced it was closing the 33 branch Tex-Mex chain Chimichanga, and closing 92 branches of the Prezzo chain, in a company voluntary arrangement (CVA) restructuring whereby rents at 57 other sites were to be reduced by between 25% and 50%. The contraction jeopardised up to 1,800 out of the 4,500 jobs at the time.

Subsidiaries
It operates using several casual dining brands:

 Chimichanga
 Caffè Uno (previously owned by Paramount Restaurants)
 Prezzo
 Cleaver
 MEXIco

References

Restaurant groups in the United Kingdom